Debbie Warren-Jeans (born 28 June 1964) is a Zimbabwean judoka. She competed in the women's half-middleweight event at the 1992 Summer Olympics.

References

External links
 

1964 births
Living people
Zimbabwean female judoka
Olympic judoka of Zimbabwe
Judoka at the 1992 Summer Olympics
Place of birth missing (living people)
African Games medalists in judo
Competitors at the 1995 All-Africa Games
African Games gold medalists for Zimbabwe